Dmitry Sakunenko (7 January 1930 – 13 September 2014) was a Russian Soviet speed skater.

At an international meet at Medeo 9–10 January 1955, Sakunenko was the first person to skate the 5000-m below eight minutes, with 7:54.9. In a later pair, Boris Shilkov improved this world record to 7:45.6. On this occasion Sakunenko set a new samalogue world record with the series 42.6, 7:54.9, 2:13.0, 16:44.3 (184.638 points). This record lasted until 1963. Sakunenko competed in the 1956 Olympics, two world championships and three European championships, with a bronze from the European championships 1955 being his best result.

World records 

Source: SpeedSkatingStats.com

References 

1930 births
2014 deaths
Russian male speed skaters
Soviet male speed skaters
Olympic speed skaters of the Soviet Union
Speed skaters at the 1956 Winter Olympics